Larva Mortus is a 2008 top-down shooter video game developed by independent developer Rake in Grass. The source code of the Torque 2D based game was made available by the developer under non-commercial usage terms in 2009.

Plot 
The game is set at the end of the 19th century. It follows an agent who was recruited by a group which specializes on exorcism of various supernatural evil creatures. He is forced to face an evil from ancient times as it plans to capture a powerful artifact of black magic. The artifact was discovered by five adventurers and broken up between them. The agent has to find all pieces before the evil does so.

Gameplay 
The player controls a hunter of monsters. Their task is to kill all enemies in a level. There are 30 types of enemies. Missions are randomly generated. There are role-playing elements, such as the player gains experience by killing monsters.

Reception 

The game received mixed to positive reviews.

References

External links 
 
 

2008 video games
Action video games
Top-down video games
Indie video games
Windows games
MacOS games
Video games developed in the Czech Republic
Video games set in the 19th century
Video games about exorcism
Dark fantasy video games
Video games using procedural generation
Commercial video games with freely available source code
Torque (game engine) games
Single-player video games
Rake in Grass games
Meridian4 games